Chrysoritis perseus, the Perseus opal, is a butterfly of the family Lycaenidae found only in South Africa.

The wingspan is 24–28 mm for males and 26–30 mm for females. Flight period is two broods from August to March, peaking November.

Larvae feed on Zygophyllum species. They are associated with ants of the genus Crematogaster.

References

Butterflies described in 1977
Chrysoritis
Endemic butterflies of South Africa